William Steward may refer to:

William Steward (New Zealand politician) (1841–1912), first Liberal Speaker of the New Zealand House of Representatives
William Steward (British politician) (1901–1987), British Member of Parliament for Woolwich West
William Steward (rector), rector of St Giles in the Fields 1579-90
William Henry Steward, president of the National Afro-American Council in the United States